Swintonia spicifera is a species of plant in the family Anacardiaceae. It is found in Indonesia, Malaysia, and the Philippines. Swintonia spicifera grows as a tree on hill and mountain ridges.

References

spicifera
Trees of Malesia
Least concern plants
Taxonomy articles created by Polbot